Mallotus eriocarpus is a species of plant in the family Euphorbiaceae. It is endemic to Sri Lanka.

References 

 http://kiki.huh.harvard.edu/databases/taxon_search.php?mode=details&id=30776
 http://mapping.fbb.utm.my/phyknome/node/15005

eriocarpus
Endemic flora of Sri Lanka
Vulnerable flora of Asia